

Events 
 January–March 
 January 14 – Third Battle of Panipat: Ahmad Shah Durrani and his coalition decisively defeat the Maratha Confederacy, and restore the Mughal Empire to Shah Alam II.
 January 16 – Siege of Pondicherry (1760) ended: The British capture Pondichéry, India from the French.
 February 8 – An earthquake in London breaks chimneys in Limehouse and Poplar.
 March 8 – A second earthquake occurs in North London, Hampstead and Highgate.
 March 31 – 1761 Portugal earthquake: A magnitude 8.5 earthquake strikes Lisbon, Portugal, with effects felt as far north as Scotland.

 April–June 
 April 1 – The Austrian Empire and the Russian Empire sign a new treaty of alliance. 
 April 4 – A severe epidemic of influenza breaks out in London and "practically the entire population of the city" is afflicted; particularly contagious to pregnant women, the disease causes an unusual number of miscarriages and premature births. 
 April 14 – Thomas Boone is transferred south to become the Royal Governor of South Carolina after proving to be unable to work with the local assembly as the Royal Governor of New Jersey. 
 May 4 – The first multiple death tornado in the 13 American colonies strikes Charleston, South Carolina, killing eight people and sinking five ships in harbor.  
 June 6 – (May 26 old style); A transit of Venus occurs, and is observed from 120 locations around the Earth. In his observations by telescope at St. Petersburg, Mikhail Lomonosov notes a ring of light around the planet's silhouette as it begins the transit, and becomes the first astronomer to discover that the planet Venus has an atmosphere.  

 July–September 
 July 17 – The first section of the Bridgewater Canal is opened, for the transportation of coal from local mines to Manchester.
 August 6 – The Parliament of Paris votes to close all colleges, associations and seminaries associated with the Jesuit Order, following a long campaign by Louis-Adrien Le Paige.   
 August 11 – Two years after his marriage to Martha Custis and his move to Mount Vernon, retired British Army General George Washington advertises a reward in the Maryland Gazette for the capture of four fugitive slaves, named Cupid, Peros, Jack, and Neptune, averring that they had escaped "without the least suspicion, provocation, or difference with anybody".   
 August 15 – The Third Family Compact is executed by King Charles III of Spain and King Louis XV of France, as well as representatives of members of the House of Bourbon, King Ferdinand IV of Naples and Philip, Duke of Parma.  
 August 29 – Cherokee leader Attakullakulla and British Army Major James Grant meet at Fort Prince George in South Carolina and begin negotiations to end the Anglo-Cherokee War.  
 September 8 – King George III of Great Britain marries Charlotte of Mecklenburg-Strelitz (Queen Charlotte).
 September 19 – The slave trade to and within Portugal is forbidden.
 September 22 – King George III and Queen Charlotte are crowned.

 October–December 
 October 1 – Austrian field marshal Ernst Gideon von Laudon captures the Prussian town of Schweidnitz (now Świdnica in Poland) during the Seven Years' War. 
 October 5 – William Pitt is dismissed from his position as Secretary of State for the Southern Department (which administers Britain's American colonies) after having been a powerful part of a coalition government with the Prime Minister, the Duke of Newcastle.
 October 30 – British Army Colonel Henry Bouquet issues the first proclamation against British settlement on Indian lands in America. 
 November 7 – The New London Harbor Light is first lit to guide ships into the Connecticut harbor; the lighthouse, only the fourth to be built has been in continuous operation for more than 250 years.  
 November 11 – The Earl of Egremont, Great Britain's Secretary of State for the Southern Department (which includes all of the American colonies), proclaims a policy against issuing any land grants in territory occupied by the American Indian tribes.  
 November 19 – A separate peace treaty is signed between the Cherokee Indians and the Colony of Virginia, bringing the Anglo-Cherokee War to a close.  
 November 26 – A 500-man force from the Army of Spain brings the revolt of Mexico's Maya population to an end, capturing the Yucatan village of Cisteil, killing about 500 of the 2,500 Mayan defenders and losing 40 of their own.   The Spaniards arrest 254 people, including Jacinto Canek, who had proclaimed himself as King Canek Montezuma of the Mayas. Canek and eight other rebellion leaders are executed less than three weeks later.  
 December 16 – Seven Years' War: After four months of siege, the Russians under Pyotr Rumyantsev take the Prussian fortress of Kolberg.

 Date unknown 

 The Halifax Treaties are concluded between the various bands of the Miꞌkmaq, other First Nations people and the British in Halifax, Nova Scotia, notably in the Burying the Hatchet ceremony on June 25.
 In Dutch Guyana, a "state" formed by escaped slaves signs a treaty with the local governor.
 Marine chronometer invented as a means to accurately determine longitude.
 Matthew Boulton's Soho Manufactory opens in the midlands of England.
 The music for "Ah! vous dirai-je, maman" ("Ah, would I tell you Mom?") is first published in France by a Monsieur Bouin in his book Les Amusements d'une Heure et Demy; in 1806, English poet Jane Taylor publishes her poem, The Star, whose words fit the rhythm of the tune and become the children's song Twinkle Twinkle Little Star. 
 Faber-Castell Company is founded by Kasper Faber in Nuremberg, Germany.
 Johann Heinrich Lambert finds a proof that π is irrational.
 l'Ordre des Chevaliers Maçons Élus Coëns de l'Univers is founded.

Births 
 January 17 – James Hall, Scottish geologist (d. 1832)
 February 1 – Christian Hendrik Persoon, South African mycologist (d. 1836)
 February 3 – Dorothea von Medem, Latvian diplomat, duchess of Courland (d. 1821) 
 February 16 – Charles Pichegru, French general (d. 1804)
 February 22 – Erik Tulindberg, Finnish composer (d. 1814)
 March 6 – Antoine-Francois Andreossy, French general (d. 1828)
 May 3 – August von Kotzebue, German dramatist (d. 1819)
 June 3 – Henry Shrapnel, British Army officer and inventor (d. 1842)

 June 7 – John Rennie the Elder, Scottish-born civil engineer (d. 1821)
 October 21 – Louis Albert Guislain Bacler d'Albe, French painter and cartographer (d. 1824)
 October 27 – Matthew Baillie, Scottish physician and pathologist (d. 1823)
 November 4 – Bertrand Andrieu, French engraver of medals (d. 1822)
 November 13 – John Moore, British general (d. 1809)
 November 20 – Pope Pius VIII (d. 1830)
 December 1 – Marie Tussaud, French wax modeller (d. 1850)
 December 24 – Jean-Louis Pons, French astronomer (d. 1831) 

 December 27 – Michael Andreas Barclay de Tolly, Russian military commander (d. 1818)
 Date unknown – Dido Elizabeth Belle, British slave heiress (d. 1804)

Deaths 
 January 4 – Stephen Hales, English physiologist, chemist, and inventor (b. 1677)
 January 7 – Darkey Kelly, Irish madam and serial murderer, executed by burning

 January 10 – Edward Boscawen, British admiral (b. 1711)
 January 26 – Charles Louis Auguste Fouquet, duc de Belle-Isle, French general and statesman (b. 1684)
 February 1 – Pierre François Xavier de Charlevoix, French historian (b. 1682)
 February 6 – Clemens August of Bavaria, Archbishop-Elector of Cologne (b. 1700)
 April 2 – William Sawyer, English cricketer (b. 1712)
 April 4 – Theodore Gardelle, Swiss painter, enameler (b. 1722)
 April 9 – William Law, English minister (b. 1686)
 April 15
 Archibald Campbell, 3rd Duke of Argyll, Scottish politician (b. 1682)
 William Oldys, English antiquarian and bibliographer (b. 1696)
 April 17 – Thomas Bayes, English mathematician (b. c. 1702)
 May 1 – August Friedrich Müller, German legal scholar, logician (b. 1684)
 May 10 
 James Colebrooke, British baronet (b. 1722)
 Richard Edgcumbe, 2nd Baron Edgcumbe, British baron, politician (b. 1716)
 May 14 – Thomas Simpson, English mathematician (b. 1710)
 June 2 – Jonas Alströmer, Swedish industrialist (b. 1685)
 June 29 – Princess Elisabeth Albertine of Saxe-Hildburghausen, Duchess consort of Mecklenburg-Strelitz (b. 1713)
 July 4 – Samuel Richardson, English writer (b. 1689)
 July 9 – Carl Gotthelf Gerlach, German organist (b. 1704)
 July 13 – Tokugawa Ieshige, Japanese shōgun (b. 1712)
 July 16 – Jacob Fortling, Danish sculptor (b. 1711)
 August 3 – Johann Matthias Gesner, German classical scholar (b. 1691)
 September 8 – Bernard Forest de Bélidor, French engineer (b. 1698)
 October 22 – Louis George, Margrave of Baden-Baden (b. 1702)
 October 25 – Gioacchino Conti, Italian opera singer (b. 1714)
 November 21 – Charles Holmes, British Royal Navy admiral (b. 1711)
 November 30 – John Dollond, English optician (b. 1706)
 December 9 – Tarabai, Indian queen regent of the Maratha Empire (b. 1675)
 December 15 – John Willes (judge), English lawyer (b. 1685)
 December 23 – Alestair Ruadh MacDonnell, Scottish Jacobite spy (b. c. 1725)
 December 25 – Princess Dorothea of Schleswig-Holstein-Sonderburg-Beck, German noble (b. 1685)
 date unknown – Aldegonde Jeanne Pauli, banker in the Austrian Netherlands (b. 1685)

References